Lieutenant General Sir Philip Melmoth Nelson Guy  (1804–1878) was Commander of British Troops in China and Hong Kong and Lieutenant Governor of Jersey.

Military career
Guy was commissioned into the 5th Regiment of Foot in 1824. He went on to command the British Troops at Danapur in India in 1857.

He was appointed Commander of British Troops in China and Hong Kong in 1864 and Lieutenant Governor of Jersey in 1868, a post he relinquished in 1873.

References

|-

1804 births
1878 deaths
Military personnel from Devon
Knights Commander of the Order of the Bath
British Army lieutenant generals
Royal Northumberland Fusiliers officers
Governors of Jersey
British military personnel of the Indian Rebellion of 1857